The Teal River is a river of the Nelson Region of New Zealand's South Island. It flows north from its origins in hilly country to the west of the city of Nelson to reach the Wakapuaka River.

See also
List of rivers of New Zealand

References

Rivers of the Nelson Region
Rivers of New Zealand